Geliskhanov (Russian: Гелисханов) is an Asian masculine surname, its feminine counterpart is Geliskhanova. It may refer to
Magomed Geliskhanov (born 1986), Russian football player
Rizvan Geliskhanov (born 1963), Soviet weightlifter of Chechen origin 
Sultan Geliskhanov, head of the state security in the Chechen Republic of Ichkeria